Norman Mick Glenister (23 August 1915 – 17 November 1963) was an Australian rules footballer who played with Geelong in the VFL during the 1930s and 1940s.

Whether playing as a half forward flanker, centreman or rover, Glenister was a consistent goalkicker for Geelong and bar his debut year when he played just two games never failed to kick 20 goals in a season. He missed Geelong's 1937 premiership due to injury and topped their goalkicking in 1939 with 36 goals. His best season tally however was 50 goals which he kicked in 1938. A Victorian interstate representative, he kicked five goals in a game against South Australia in 1939.

Glenister also played for Victorian Football Association club Coburg, crossing without a clearance in 1941 during the throw-pass era, before returning to Geelong in 1945 after his suspension for crossing without a clearance had ended.

Glenister's brother Harold played alongside him in the same team briefly.

References

Holmesby, Russell and Main, Jim (2007). The Encyclopedia of AFL Footballers. 7th ed. Melbourne: Bas Publishing.

External links

1915 births
Australian rules footballers from Victoria (Australia)
Geelong Football Club players
Geelong West Football Club players
Coburg Football Club players
1963 deaths